Good Time is the fifteenth studio album by American country music artist Alan Jackson. It was released on March 4, 2008 and produced five singles on the country singles charts. The first three of these — "Small Town Southern Man", the title track, and "Country Boy" — have all become Number One hits. This album marked Alan Jackson's return to the traditional country music roots.

Good Time debuted at number one on the U.S. Billboard 200 chart, selling about 119,000 copies in its first week, and was certified Platinum on February 16, 2010.

Production
After working with Alison Krauss for his previous studio album, Like Red on a Rose, Jackson returned to Keith Stegall (who had produced or co-produced all of Jackson's previous albums) as his producer for this album. Good Time is also the first album of his career on which Jackson wrote all of the material by himself.

Singles
"Small Town Southern Man", the first single, was released in late 2007, and in March 2008, the song reached the top of the Billboard Hot Country Songs charts, becoming Jackson's first Number One hit since "Remember When" in 2004. The album itself was released in March 2008. Following "Small Town Southern Man" were the album's title track and "Country Boy", both of which became Number One hits as well. "Sissy's Song", a song which Jackson originally recorded for the funeral of his housekeeper, was released in March 2009 as the fourth single, and "I Still Like Bologna" was released in August as the fifth.

Track listing

Chart performance
Good Time debuted  at #1 on the U.S. Billboard 200, becoming his fourth  #1 album, and #1 on the Top Country Albums, becoming his tenth #1 country album. In February 2010, Good Time was certified Platinum by the RIAA.

Weekly charts

Year-end charts

Sales and Certifications

Personnel

 Robert Bailey – background vocals
 Eddie Bayers – drums
 Angela Bennett – background vocals
 Jamaal Carter – background vocals
 Jimmy Carter – bass guitar
 Janice Corder – background vocals
 Melodie Crittenden – background vocals
 Stuart Duncan – fiddle, mandolin
 Robbie Flint – lap steel guitar
 Paul Franklin – Dobro, pedal steel guitar, lap steel guitar
 Vicki Hampton – background vocals
 Emily Harris – background vocals
 Greenwood Hart – vocoder
 Jim Hoke – harmonica, bass harmonica, accordion, Jew's harp
 Alan Jackson – lead vocals
 Edward Jenkins – background vocals
 Shane Keister – vocoder
 Lucas Ketner – percussion
 Martina McBride – duet vocals on "Never Loved Before"
 Brent Mason – electric guitar, acoustic guitar, six-string bass guitar
 James Mitchell – accordion, electric guitar
 Shandra Penix – background vocals
 Gary Prim – piano, keyboards, Hammond B-3 organ, clavinet, Wurlitzer
 Hargus "Pig" Robbins – piano, Hammond B-3 organ, Wurlitzer
 John Wesley Ryles – background vocals
 Bruce Watkins – acoustic guitar, banjo
 Glenn Worf – bass guitar, upright bass

References

External links
 

2008 albums
Alan Jackson albums
Arista Records albums
Albums produced by Keith Stegall